The 2015 IIHF U18 World Championship was the 17th IIHF World U18 Championship, and was hosted by Zug and Lucerne, Switzerland. The tournament began on 16 April 2015, with the gold medal game played on 26 April 2015.

Top Division

Officials
The IIHF selected 12 referees and 10 linesmen to work the 2015 IIHF U18 World Championship.
They were the following:

Referees
  Jimmy Bergamelli
  Andreas Harnebring
  Brett Iverson
  Andreas Koch
  Petri Lindqvist
  Robert Mullner
  Yuri Oskirko
  Vladimír Pešina
  Christopher Pitoscia
  Marian Rohatsch
  Ladislav Smetana
  Per Gustav Solem

Linesmen
  Markku Buese
  Franco Espinoza
  Jiří Gebauer
  Martin Korba
  Ludvig Lundgren
  Brian Oliver
  Alexander Otmakhov
  Nicolas Piche
  Hannu Sormunen
  Michael Tscherrig

Preliminary round

Group A

All times are local. (Central European Summer Time – UTC+02:00)

Group B

All times are local. (Central European Summer Time – UTC+02:00)

Relegation round 
The last-placed teams played a best-of-three series.

 Germany is relegated to next year's Division I A; the third game was not played because the result of the relegation series had been decided.

Knockout stage

Quarterfinals

Semifinals

Bronze medal game

Gold medal game

Scoring leaders
List shows the top ten skaters sorted by points, then goals.

GP = Games played; G = Goals; A = Assists; Pts = Points; +/− = Plus-minus; PIM = Penalties In MinutesSource: IIHF.com

Leading goaltenders
Only the top five goaltenders, based on save percentage, who have played 40% of their team's minutes are included in this list.
TOI = Time on ice (minutes:seconds); SA = Shots against; GA = Goals against; GAA = Goals against average; Sv% = Save percentage; SO = ShutoutsSource: IIHF.com

Tournament awards

Most Valuable Player
 Forward:  Auston Matthews

All-star team
 Goaltender:  Veini Vehviläinen
 Defencemen:  Vili Saarijärvi,  Jonas Siegenthaler
 Forwards:  Patrik Laine,  Denis Malgin,  Auston Matthews

IIHF best player awards
 Goaltender:  Ilya Samsonov
 Defenceman:  Vili Saarijärvi
 Forward:  Auston Matthews
References: ,

Final standings

Division I

Division I A
The Division I A tournament was played in Debrecen, Hungary, from 12 to 18 April 2015.

Division I B
The Division I B tournament was played in Maribor, Slovenia, from 12 to 18 April 2015.

Division II

Division II A
The Division II A tournament was played in Tallinn, Estonia, from 22 to 28 March 2015.

Division II B
The Division II B tournament was played in Novi Sad, Serbia, from 16 to 22 March 2015.

Division III

Division III A
The Division III A tournament was played in Taipei City, Taiwan, from 22 to 28 March 2015.

Division III B
The Division III B tournament was played in Auckland, New Zealand, from 17 to 19 March 2015.

References

External links
Website

 
IIHF World U18 Championships
IIHF World U18 Championships
World
Zug
Sport in Lucerne
2015
April 2015 sports events in Europe